This is a list of schools in Malaysia, listed by their type as follows:

Primary School education

National primary schools

National-type primary schools

 National-type primary schools (Chinese)
 National-type primary schools (Tamil)

Secondary School education

National secondary schools
 National secondary schools
 Fully residential secondary schools
 Arts secondary schools
 Sports secondary schools
 Technical/vocational secondary schools
 MARA junior science colleges
 Missionary schools in Malaysia
 Religious secondary school
 Islamic national secondary schools
 Islamic government-aided secondary schools
 Special education schools

Private secondary schools
 Chinese independent high school
 International secondary schools
 Private secondary schools

High schools
 All Saints Secondary School
 Batu Pahat High School
 Muar High School
 Bukit Mertajam High School
 Catholic High School, Melaka
 Catholic High School, Petaling Jaya
 Chinese High School (Batu Pahat)
 Kajang High School
 Klang High School
 Kluang High School
 Kota Kinabalu High School
 Kuala Selangor High School
 Kuching High School
 Lake Gardens High School
 Malacca High School
 Malacca Chinese High School
 Malacca Girls' High School
 Port Dickson High School
 Sabah Chinese High School
 Sarikei High School
 Segamat High School
 Setapak High School
 St. David's High School, Malacca
 Foon Yew High School
 St. John Institution

International schools
Kuala Lumpur & Selangor

 The Alice Smith School
 Al-Noor International School
 Asia Pacific International School (APIS)
 Baseerah International School
 Dwi Emas International School (1st Entrepreneurial School in Malaysia)
 Idrissi International School
 Kingsley International School
 Maz International School
 Marlborough College Malaysia
 Rafflesia International Schools
 REAL International School
 Regent International School
 Rocklin International School (Affordable American Education)
 Sayfol International School
 Sri Emas International School (sister school of Dwi Emas International School)
 Sri Kuala Lumpur International School
 Sri KDU International Secondary School
 Tanarata International School
 UCSI International School (Subang Jaya, Springhill, and Kuala Lumpur campuses)
 Taylors International School

Higher education

Colleges
 Crescendo International College
 Sunway College Johor Bahru
 Institute CECE
 VTAR Institute

Community colleges

University colleges

 Han Chiang University College of Communication
 New Era University College
 Southern University College
 Tunku Abdul Rahman University College

Polytechnics

 Premier Polytechnic Ungku Omar (PUO)
 Premier Polytechnic Sultan Salahuddin Abdul Aziz Shah (PSA)
 Premier Polytechnic Ibrahim Sultan (PIS)
 Conventional Polytechnic
 METrO Polytechnic

Vocational colleges
 New Era University College
 New Era Institute of Vocational & Continuing Education (NEIVCE)
 German-Malaysian Institute
 Penang Skills Development Centre (PSDC)
 Skill-Tech Institute
 VTAR Institute

Police training colleges
 Royal Malaysian Police College Kuala Lumpur
 PULAPOL

Nursing colleges

 Universiti Tunku Abdul Rahman
 International Medical University
 Tung Shin Academy of Nursing
 Adventist College of Nursing and Health Sciences
 Lam Wah Ee Nursing College
 Assunta College of Nursing

Teacher education institutes
 List of teacher education institutes in Malaysia

Universities

See also
 Education in Malaysia

External links 
 Directory of Schools in Malaysia
 Ministry of Education website
 Connection.my – Projek Direktori Pelajar Malaysia
 SMJK School Portal
 UCSCAM
 Direktori Sekolah Menengah Persendirian Cina

 
Schools